Jeong Mun-bu (1565–1624) was a Korean statesman and patriot. In 1592, nine days into the Japanese invasion of Korea, he formed a militia to fight against the Japanese army.

In 1585 Jeong passed a gwageo for the selection of officials and became an officer of the military training department of Hanseong (hanseongbupanyun).

Next year, he was promoted to an officer of the book publishing department of Hongmungwan (hongmungwansuchan), and then he was in charge of dual positions, a reporting officer at Saganwon (Saganwonjeongwon) and a junghakgyosu. In 1590, he was appointed as an inspecting officer at Saheonbu (Saheonbujipyeong), also serving as a member of King's assistant group. In the next year, he was dispatched to the northeastern border as a crops commander of this region.

Following the war with Japan in 1592, Guk Gyeong-in took up arms in rebellion in Hoeryong, captured and turned two princes Prince Imhae and Prince Sunhwa and their entourages Kim Gui-yeong,  Hwang Jeong-uk and Hwang Hyeok over to the enemy chief Katō Kiyomasa before surrendering himself. Fuming at the revolt, Jeonng put together a righteous army with seonbis.

The righteous army led by Jeonng arrested Guk and beheaded him, and then won battles at Myungchun, GilJoo and SSangpo against the Japanese army. They totally reclaimed the northeastern province by winning at Baegtapgyo in the next year.

In 1624, he died while being tortured after he was arrested and falsely accused of participating in a revolt of Yi Gwal. Long after, he was posthumously reinstated after the accusation was proved unfounded.

Korean generals
People of the Japanese invasions of Korea (1592–1598)
16th-century births
1617 deaths
16th-century Korean people